The 2014 Laurence Olivier Awards was held on Sunday 13 April 2014 at the Royal Opera House, London. The awards were presented by Gemma Arterton and Stephen Mangan. The highlights programme was presented on ITV after the ceremony.

Winners and nominees
The nominations were announced on 10 March 2014 in 26 categories.

Productions with multiple nominations and awards
The following 16 productions received multiple nominations:

 7: Charlie and the Chocolate Factory and Merrily We Roll Along
 6: Once, The Book of Mormon and The Scottsboro Boys
 5: Chimerica and Ghosts
 4: The Light Princess
 3: The Amen Corner
 2: Coriolanus, Henry V, Othello, Peter and Alice, Private Lives, The Sound of Music and The Wind in the Willows

The following six productions received multiple awards:

 5: Chimerica
 4: The Book of Mormon
 3: Ghosts
 2: Charlie and the Chocolate Factory, Merrily We Roll Along and Once

See also
 68th Tony Awards

References

External links
 Olivier Awards official website

Laurence Olivier Awards ceremonies
Laurence Olivier
Laurence Olivier Awards
Laurence Olivier Awards
April 2014 events in the United Kingdom
Royal Opera House